El día que murió el silencio (The Day Silence Died) is a 1997 Bolivian drama film directed by Paolo Agazzi.

Synopsis

A handsome and mysterious stranger, played by Darío Grandinetti, walks into the town square of Villaserena one day and strategically places loudspeakers around the town, blaring a variety of musical tunes. Soon, he begins to sell airtime to the various locals, who broadcast their own personal love dedications and (more frequently) insults for all to hear.

A subplot evolves between Abelardo (the stranger), Celeste (a young woman who is chained inside her father's house to stop her running away), and José (a young man).

External links

Film details (in Spanish)

Films directed by Paolo Agazzi
1997 films
Bolivian romantic drama films
1997 drama films